Hazel's Theory of Evolution is a young adult novel by Lisa Jenn Bigelow. In 2019 HarperCollins published the book, which received the Lambda Literary Award in 2020.

The novel tells the story of Hazel, a thirteen-year-old girl who feels left behind by her best friend, Becca. One of her mothers is also pregnant again, but Hazel is not confident about having a new sibling, as her mother has suffered two miscarriages.

Reception 
Kirkus Reviews praised the diversity present in the book's cast. They also said that "[h]er first-person narration is insightful" and the main character is "highly likable." Publishers Weekly also praised the varied cast in Bigelow's book, as well as her "relatable first-person narrative", which the author uses to address universal conflicts.

Writing for the School Library Journal, Lisa Gieskes recommended the book, saying that "readers will find [Hazel's] sensitive, reflective nature heartening." Carolyn Phelan, for Booklist, called it "[a] heartfelt novel of family, friends, and change." Phelan also noted the author's skill at building up towards the climax, as well as her portrayal of empathetic characters.

Hazel's Theory of Evolution won the 2020 Lambda Literary Award in the "Children's/Middle Grade" category.

References 

2019 children's books
2019 American novels
2019 LGBT-related literary works
2010s LGBT novels
American young adult novels
American LGBT novels
Children's books with LGBT themes
LGBT-related young adult novels
Lambda Literary Award-winning works
HarperCollins books